George Howell Jones (1887–1950) was an American architect.  He designed many school buildings in the Portland Public School District in the 1920s and 1930s.

Life
George Jones was born on May 24, 1887, in Portland, Oregon.  His father, Thomas J. Jones, was also a Portland architect, and designed some of the early school buildings in Portland.  Jones went to the Massachusetts Institute of Technology, where he graduated with a degree in architecture in 1913.  His thesis was "a design for a building for the supreme court of the United States."

Once he had graduated, he worked for the firm York and Sawyer, and was a lieutenant in the U. S. Army Combat Engineers.  He also worked for the firm Crow, Lewis, and Wick.
Between 1920 and 1934, Jones worked for Portland School District No. 1, where he, along with Floyd Naramore, designed over twenty new schools.

Jones was a member of the American Institute of Architects from 1938 to 1942.  By 1940, he had moved on to working in a partnership with Harold Dickson Marsh, as a firm known as Jones & Marsh.  George Howell Jones died from a heart attack in Portland, Oregon on January 9, 1950.

References

Architects from Portland, Oregon
1887 births
1950 deaths